Mauricio José Arteaga (born 8 August 1988 in Cuenca) is an Ecuadorian racewalker.

Career
He competed in the 20 km walk at the 2012 Summer Olympics, where he placed 44th.  He was disqualified at the 2016 Summer Olympics.

In 2019, he competed in the men's 20 kilometres walk at the 2019 World Athletics Championships held in Doha, Qatar. He did not finish his race.

Personal bests

Track walk
10,000 m: 42:24.5 min (ht) –  Quito, 16 May 2009
20,000 m: 1:23:19.3 hrs (ht) –  Santiago, 15 March 2014

Road walk
10 km: 40:36 min –  Rome, 7 May 2016
20 km: 1:21:08 hrs –  Rome, 7 May 2016

Achievements

References

External links
 
 

1988 births
Living people
Ecuadorian male racewalkers
Olympic athletes of Ecuador
Athletes (track and field) at the 2012 Summer Olympics
Athletes (track and field) at the 2016 Summer Olympics
People from Cuenca, Ecuador
World Athletics Championships athletes for Ecuador
South American Games bronze medalists for Ecuador
South American Games medalists in athletics
Competitors at the 2010 South American Games
Competitors at the 2014 South American Games
Athletes (track and field) at the 2019 Pan American Games
Pan American Games competitors for Ecuador
Ibero-American Championships in Athletics winners
21st-century Ecuadorian people